AlirezaEzzati (born 31 January 1987 ) is an Iranian footballer.

Club career
Ezzati started his career with Naft Tehran at Youth levels. Alireza Ezzati started playing senior level for Naft Tehran from 2007, he officially made his debut for Naft Tehran in Persian Gulf Pro League facing Steel Azin, the game finished 1-1.  He extend his contract with Naft Tehran till 2015 in July 2012.

Club career statistics

Honours

Club
Naft Tehran
Persian Gulf Pro League : 2013-14 third place, 2014–15 third place
Azadegan League (1): 2009-10
Hazfi Cup (1): 2016–17 , 2014–15 runner up
Iranian Super Cup : 2017 runner up

References

External links
 Alireza Ezzati at PersianLeague.com

Living people
Naft Tehran F.C. players
Persian Gulf Pro League players
Azadegan League players
Iranian footballers
1987 births
Association football midfielders
People from Tehran Province